Kenneth Cecil James (12 March 1904 – 21 August 1976), was a New Zealand Test cricketer who played for Wellington and Northamptonshire. He also served in New Zealand's Royal Air Force during second World War.

Early career
A wicket-keeper and a useful batsman, James first played for Wellington in 1923 and toured England with the first New Zealand touring party in 1927 ostensibly as second string to Tom Lowry. But he quickly made the wicket-keeping position his own, with 85 dismissals on the tour, including eight at Derby. His understanding of the spin of Bill Merritt, the touring team's most successful bowler, was especially noted.  No Test matches were played on the 1927 tour.

James was first-choice wicket-keeper for New Zealand's first Test matches in 1929–30 against England, and again on the tour of England in 1931, and in the home series against South Africa in 1931–32 and against England the following season. In 11 Tests he made 16 dismissals ( 11 Catches and 5 stumps)but failed completely as a batsman, scoring only 52 runs in total with an average of just 4.72 . However, he was the highest scorer in the Plunket Shield in 1932–33, with 269 runs at an average of 44.83.

Later career
James then left New Zealand for England to qualify by residence as a county player for Northamptonshire, becoming the regular wicket-keeper from 1936 to 1939 and being joined there by Merritt. For a very weak county — Northamptonshire failed to win a single match for four years from May 1935 — James was notable not only for his wicket-keeping but also increasingly as a batsman, and in 1938, he scored more than 1,000 runs and made two centuries.

James served in the Royal New Zealand Air Force during the Second World War. He returned to New Zealand, where he played one more first-class match, captaining Wellington against Auckland in the 1946-47 Plunket Shield just before his 43rd birthday. He later played a few matches in the Hawke Cup for Hutt Valley, taking part in the match in 1948–49 in which they won the title for the first time.

He retired from cricket to run a public house. He died at Palmerston North.

References

External links

 (includes Wisden obituary)

1904 births
1976 deaths
New Zealand cricketers
New Zealand Test cricketers
Pre-1930 New Zealand representative cricketers
Northamptonshire cricketers
Wellington cricketers
New Zealand military personnel of World War II
Royal New Zealand Air Force personnel
Sir L. Parkinson's XI cricketers
New Zealand Services cricketers
Wicket-keepers